The Giant Void (also known as the Giant Void in NGH, Canes Venatici Supervoid, and AR-Lp 36) is an extremely large region of space with an underdensity of galaxies and located in the constellation Canes Venatici. It is the second-largest-confirmed void to date, with an estimated diameter of 300 to 400 Mpc (1 to 1.3 billion light-years) and its centre is approximately 1.5 billion light-years away (z = 0.116). It was discovered in 1988, and was the largest void in the Northern Galactic Hemisphere, and possibly the second-largest ever detected. Even the hypothesized "Eridanus Supervoid" corresponding to the location of the WMAP cold spot is dwarfed by this void, although the Giant Void does not correspond to any significant cooling to the cosmic microwave background.

Inside this vast void there are 17 galaxy clusters, concentrated in a spherically shaped region 50 Mpc in diameter. Studies of the motion of these clusters show that they have no interaction to each other, meaning the density of the clusters is very low resulting in weak gravitational interaction. The void's location in the sky is close to the Boötes Void.

See also

 KBC Void
 Large-scale structure of the cosmos
 List of largest voids
 Local Void
 Microscopium Void
 Northern Local Supervoid
 Southern Local Supervoid
 South Pole Wall 
 Void (astronomy)

References

Voids (astronomy)
Canes Venatici